ATAS may refer to:

Academic Technology Approval Scheme
Academy of Television Arts & Sciences
AIM-92 Stinger, (aka Air To Air Stinger) air-to-air missile
Association of Top Achiever Scouts

See also
Al-Attas (disambiguation)
ATAŞ (Refinery)